George Sullivan (born March 13, 1981) is an American mixed martial artist competing in the Welterweight and Middleweight divisions. A professional mixed martial artist since 2006, Sullivan has also competed in the Ultimate Fighting Championship.

Mixed martial arts career

Early career
Sullivan made his professional debut in 2006 competing in regional promotions in his native New Jersey, compiled a record of 14–3, and won the Cage Fury Fighting Championships Welterweight Championship. Sullivan signed with the UFC in the winter of 2013.

Ultimate Fighting Championship
Sullivan made his promotional debut against fellow newcomer Mike Rhodes on January 25, 2014, at UFC on Fox 10.  Sullivan won the fight via unanimous decision.

In his next fight, Sullivan faced Igor Araújo on September 13, 2014, at UFC Fight Night 51.  After winning the first round, Sullivan won the bout via knockout in the second round as he was able to land several punches from within Araújo's half guard, forcing the referee to stop the fight.

Sullivan was expected to face Kenny Robertson on April 18, 2015, at UFC on Fox 15.  However, Robertson pulled out of the bout citing injury and was replaced by Tim Means. He lost the back and forth fight via submission in the third round.

Sullivan was expected to face Marcio Alexandre Jr. on July 12, 2015, at The Ultimate Fighter 21 Finale.  However, Alexandre pulled out of the fight during the week leading up to the event citing a rib injury and was replaced by promotional newcomer Dominic Waters. Sullivan won the one-sided fight via unanimous decision.

Sullivan faced Alexander Yakovlev at UFC on Fox 18 on January 30, 2016. He lost the fight via knockout in the first round.

Sullivan was expected to face Héctor Urbina on July 23, 2016, at UFC on Fox 20. However, Sullivan was pulled from the event due to a "potential compliance issue" with the UFC's anti-doping policy stemming from "voluntarily disclosed information" he provided to USADA.

Sullivan was expected to face Randy Brown on February 11, 2017, at UFC 208, but was pulled from the card after USADA informed him of another potential violation.

Sullivan faced Niko Price January 27, 2018 at UFC on Fox: Jacaré vs. Brunson 2. He lost the fight via rear-naked choke submission in the second round.

Sullivan faced Mickey Gall on August 25, 2018, at UFC Fight Night 135. He lost the fight via rear-naked choke submission in the first round.

It was announced in October 2018 that Sullivan was released from UFC.

Championships and accomplishments
Cage Fury Fighting Championships
CFFC Welterweight Championship (One time)

Mixed martial arts record

|-
| Win
| align=center| 19–8 (2) 
| Albert McCowin
| Decision (unanimous)
| Ring of Combat 79
| 
| align=center|3
| align=center|5:00
| Atlantic City, New Jersey, United States
| 
|-
| NC 
| align=center| 18–8 (2) 
| Joe Riggs
| NC (overturned)
| Ring of Combat 70
| 
| align=center|3
| align=center|2:08
| Atlantic City, New Jersey, United States
| 
|-
| Win
| align=center| 18–8 (1) 
| Thomas Powell
| Decision (unanimous)
| Ring of Combat 68
| 
| align=center|3
| align=center|4:00
| Atlantic City, New Jersey, United States
| 
|-
| Loss
| align=center| 17–8 (1) 
| Manny Walo
| Decision (unanimous)
| Maverick MMA 10
| 
| align=center|5
| align=center|5:00
| Stroudsburg, Pennsylvania, United States
| 
|-
|Loss
|align=center|17–7 (1)
|Mickey Gall
|Submission (rear-naked choke)
|UFC Fight Night: Gaethje vs. Vick 
|
|align=center|1
|align=center|1:09
|Lincoln, Nebraska, United States
|
|-
|Loss
|align=center|17–6 (1)
|Niko Price
|Submission (rear-naked choke)
|UFC on Fox: Jacaré vs. Brunson 2 
|
|align=center|2
|align=center|4:21
|Charlotte, North Carolina, United States
|
|-
|Loss
|align=center|17–5 (1)
|Alexander Yakovlev
|KO (punch)
|UFC on Fox: Johnson vs. Bader
|
|align=center|1
|align=center|3:59
|Newark, New Jersey, United States
|
|-
|Win
|align=center|17–4 (1)
|Dominic Waters
|Decision (unanimous)
|The Ultimate Fighter: American Top Team vs. Blackzilians Finale 
|
|align=center|3
|align=center|5:00
|Las Vegas, Nevada, United States
|
|-
|Loss
|align=center| 16–4 (1)
|Tim Means
| Submission (arm-triangle choke)
|UFC on Fox: Machida vs. Rockhold 
|
|align=center| 3
|align=center| 3:41
|Newark, New Jersey, United States
|
|-
| Win
|align=center| 16–3 (1)
|Igor Araújo
| KO (punches)
|UFC Fight Night: Bigfoot vs. Arlovski
|
|align=center|2
|align=center|2:31
|Brasília, Brazil
|
|-
| Win
|align=center| 15–3 (1)
|Mike Rhodes
| Decision (unanimous)
|UFC on Fox: Henderson vs. Thomson
|
|align=center|3
|align=center|5:00
|Chicago, Illinois, United States
|
|-
| Win
|align=center| 14–3 (1)
|Jesus Martinez
| TKO (punches) 
|CFFC 26
|
|align=center|2
|align=center|3:12
|Atlantic City, New Jersey, United States
|
|-
| Win
|align=center|13–3 (1)
|Brandon Becker
| TKO (punches)
|CFFC 24
|
|align=center|2
|align=center|1:53
|Atlantic City, New Jersey, United States
|
|-
| Win
|align=center|
|Julian Lane
| TKO (punches)
|CFFC 19
|
|align=center|2
|align=center|2:30
|Atlantic City, New Jersey, United States
|
|-
| Win
|align=center| 11–3 (1)
|Tenyeh Dixon
| Decision (unanimous)
|CFFC 16
|
|align=center|5
|align=center|5:00
|Atlantic City, New Jersey, United States
|
|-
| Win
|align=center| 10–3 (1)
|Greg Soto
| KO (punch)
|CFFC 14
|
|align=center|1
|align=center|2:03
|Atlantic City, New Jersey, United States
|
|-
| Win
|align=center| 9–3 (1)
|Mike Winters
| Decision (unanimous)
|CFFC 12
|
|align=center|3
|align=center|5:00
|Atlantic City, New Jersey, United States
|
|-
| Loss
|align=center| 8–3 (1)
|Elijah Harshbarger
| Decision (unanimous)
|Ring of Combat 35
|
|align=center|3
|align=center|5:00
|Atlantic City, New Jersey, United States
|For Ring of Combat Welterweight Championship.
|-
| Win
|align=center| 8–2 (1)
|Erik Oganov
| Decision (unanimous)
|Ring of Combat 33
|
|align=center|3
|align=center|4:00
|Atlantic City, New Jersey, United States
|
|-
| Win
|align=center| 7–2 (1)
|James Frier
| TKO (knees and punches)
|Ring of Combat 31
|
|align=center|1
|align=center|2:24
|Atlantic City, New Jersey, United States
|
|-
| Win
|align=center| 6–2 (1)
|Tiawan Howard
| TKO (punches)
|Ring of Combat 29
|
|align=center|2
|align=center|2:31
|Atlantic City, New Jersey, United States
|
|-
| Win
|align=center| 5–2 (1)
|Al Buck
| TKO (punches)
|WCA: Pure Combat
|
|align=center|1
|align=center|3:58
|Atlantic City, New Jersey, United States
|
|-
| Loss
|align=center| 4–2 (1)
|Nick Calandrino
| Submission (eye injury)
|BCX 4
|
|align=center|1
|align=center|3:13
|Atlantic City, New Jersey, United States
|
|-
| Win
|align=center| 4–1 (1)
|Roberto Concepcion
| TKO (knees and punches)
|BCX 3
|
|align=center|1
|align=center|1:38
|Atlantic City, New Jersey, United States
|
|-
| Win
|align=center| 3–1 (1)
|David Porter
| TKO (punches)
|Ring of Combat 13
|
|align=center|1
|align=center|2:08
|Atlantic City, New Jersey, United States
|
|-
| Loss
|align=center| 2–1 (1)
|Marc Stevens
| Submission (rear-naked choke)
|CITC: Marked Territory
|
|align=center|3
|align=center|2:58
|Lincroft, New Jersey, United States
|
|-
|NC
|align=center| 2–0 (1)
|Rob Russo
|NC (illegal knee)
|Reality Fighting 13
|
|align=center|2
|align=center|1:12
|Wildwood, New Jersey, United States
|
|-
| Win
|align=center| 2–0
|Anthony D'Angelo
| Decision (split)
|Reality Fighting 12
|
|align=center|3
|align=center|3:00
|Atlantic City, New Jersey, United States
|
|-
| Win
|align=center| 1–0
|Gregg Small
| TKO (punches)
|Reality Fighting 11
|
|align=center|2
|align=center|1:30
|Atlantic City, New Jersey, United States
|
|-

See also
 List of current UFC fighters
 List of male mixed martial artists

References

External links

Living people
1981 births
American male mixed martial artists
American sportspeople in doping cases
Doping cases in mixed martial arts
Welterweight mixed martial artists
Mixed martial artists utilizing Brazilian jiu-jitsu
Mixed martial artists from New Jersey
People from Red Bank, New Jersey
Sportspeople from Monmouth County, New Jersey
American practitioners of Brazilian jiu-jitsu
Ultimate Fighting Championship male fighters